Aapo Pukk (born 3 October 1962, in Tartu) is an Estonian artist. He is mainly known by his portraits and posters.

1980 he graduated from Estonian Art Academy.

Gallery

References

Living people
1962 births
20th-century Estonian painters
20th-century Estonian male artists
21st-century Estonian painters
Estonian Academy of Arts alumni
People from Tartu